Paraburkholderia monticola is a Gram-negative, short-rod-shaped and aerobic bacterium from the genus Paraburkholderia which has been isolated from soil from the Gwanak Mountain in Korea.

References

External links
Type strain of Burkholderia monticola at BacDive—the Bacterial Diversity Metadatabase

monticola
Bacteria described in 2015